Şıxbağı (also, Şıhbağı, Shikhbagi, Shykhbagy, and Şıxbağ) is a village and municipality in the Zardab Rayon of Azerbaijan.  It has a population of 396.

References 

Populated places in Zardab District